Robert Alan Minkler (August 31, 1937 – October 11, 2015) was an American sound engineer. He won an Oscar for Best Sound and was nominated for another in the same category. He worked on more than 50 films between 1957 and 1992. Minkler died of respiratory failure at his home in Oregon.

Selected filmography
Won
 Star Wars Episode IV: A New Hope (1977)

Nominated
 Tron (1982)

References

External links

1937 births
2015 deaths
American audio engineers
Best Sound BAFTA Award winners
Best Sound Mixing Academy Award winners
Deaths from respiratory failure
People from Glendale, California
Engineers from California